James Byron Friauf (1896  1972) was an American electrical engineer who first determined the crystal structure of MgZn2 in 1927. 
Friauf was a professor of physics at the Carnegie Institute of Technology, now Carnegie Mellon University.
He had received training in the determination of the structure of crystals as a student at California Institute of Technology where he studied with Roscoe Gilkey Dickinson.

The structure Friauf discovered consists of intra-penetrating icosahedra, which coordinate the Zn atoms, and 16-vertex polyhedra that coordinate the Mg atoms. The latter type of polyhedron is called a Friauf polyhedron and is, actually, an inter-penetrating tetrahedron and a 12-vertex truncated polyhedron. 
MgZn2 is a member of the largest class of single intermetallic structures, since referred to as the Laves phases, the Friauf phases, or the Laves–Friauf phases.

Publications

External links 

 Photo of James B. Friauf from the Smithsonian collection, date unknown.

References 

1896 births
1972 deaths
American electrical engineers
Carnegie Mellon University faculty